Cheek Creek is a stream in Bollinger County in the U.S. state of Missouri.

Cheek Creek has the name of James Cheek, an early settler.

See also
List of rivers of Missouri

References

Rivers of Bollinger County, Missouri
Rivers of Missouri